Platanus orientalis, the Old World sycamore or Oriental plane, is a large, deciduous tree of the Platanaceae family, growing to  or more, and known for its longevity and spreading crown. In autumn its deep green leaves may change to blood red, amber, and yellow.

Etymology
The species' name means 'eastern'. (In comparison, the 'western' plane (or American sycamore) is named Platanus occidentalis). The eastern plane's original distribution was eastward from the Balkans. The tree was called platane in ancient Greek history and literature and by related names in continental Europe. Equally well known in Asia from Anatolia to India and usually called chinar or chenar.

Range
The native range is Eurasia from the Balkans to at least as far east as Iran. Some accounts extend its native range to Iberia in the west, and to the Himalayas in the east. As it has been known in cultivation from early times in much of this region it can be difficult to determine if it is truly indigenous in peripheral areas.

Description

The oriental plane is found naturally in riverine settings, together with such trees as alder, willow and poplar. However, it is quite capable of survival and success in dry soils once it is established. It can grow into a massive tree with many examples hundreds of years old and several specimens around 100 m³ in total volume.

Like other plane trees, its leaves are borne alternately on the stem, deeply lobed, and palmate or maple-like. It usually has flaking bark, occasionally not flaking and becoming thick and rugged.  Flowers and fruit are round and burr-like, borne in clusters of between 2 and 6 on a stem. Considerable variation exists among trees in the wild, and this may be complicated by crossbreeding with planted London planes (Platanus x acerifolia), the hybrid of P. orientalis with the American sycamore (Platanus occidentalis).

Cultivation
The tree is capable of being grown in most temperate latitudes, though it benefits greatly from warm summers. As a very large and wide tree with broad, thick leaves that tend to orient horizontally, it is especially prized for the shade and coolness it provides during the hot season.

It grows best in rich soil in a sunny location and can survive drought well. Although young plants appreciate regular watering.

Other uses
The leaves and bark have been used medicinally. A fabric dye has been made from the twigs and roots. The timber, often called lacewood, is figured and valuable for indoor furniture.  The leaves are also often used by artists for leaf carving.

Cultural history

Greece

The Tree of Hippocrates, under which Hippocrates — the "Father of Medicine" — taught at Kos, is reputed to have been an oriental plane. A 500-year-old tree presently there may be on the same site and may have been planted from a succession of cuttings from the original. The Athenian Academy, outside Athens, featured a sacred grove of planes where the students listened to the masters and where among others the Peripatetics practiced philosophy.

Many villages in Greece feature plane trees in their main squares, frequently found alongside them are water springs that in the past would serve as the main water source for the villagers; usually these are quite old trees with their age seen as a point of pride for the local inhabitants. Occasionally the oldest trees exhibit partially hollowed out trunks, with cavities large enough to provide amusement opportunities for local or visiting children and teenagers, and even serving (along with the rest of the tree) as tourist attractions or at least in one occasion a shrine.

Rome
Pliny's Natural History records the westward progress of the plane "introduced among us from a foreign clime for nothing but its shade", planted first at the tomb of Diomedes on the island of Tremiti, then imported to Greek Sicily by Dionysius the Elder (c. 432-367 BC), tyrant of Syracuse. He had plane-trees conveyed to the city of Rhegium (Reggio di Calabria), where they were looked upon as the great marvel of his palace, according to Pliny's sources. From there it spread by the first century CE as far as the lands of the Morini in Belgic Gaul. Regardless of why it may have been introduced, the tree had medicinal uses from early times. Pliny details 25 remedies using preparation from the bark, leaves and excrescences of plane. Pliny prescribes it for burns, bites, stings, frostbite and infections.

Pliny goes on to describe some legendary plane trees. Licinius Mucianus held a banquet for 19 in a hollow plane-tree of Lycia, and the emperor Caligula another for 15 plus servants in a tree house (nest) built in the branches of a plane-tree at Velletri.

Kashmir

Muslim Kashmiris believe that the chinar was brought to the Kashmir valley by Islamic preachers from Iran in the 14th century AD, while Hindu Kashmiris hold a view that the tree was traditionally planted near Hindu holy places in Kashmir and is associated with Hindu goddess Bhavani.  After the advent of Muslim rule, especially under the Mughals, Chinar became a major garden and landscape tree, and dominates many historic gardens.  It is a living heritage of Kashmir. It is seen as a symbol for the region. It is a majestic tree that can be found throughout the landscape of the valley, hillsides and cities, generally called  in Kashmiri and chinar in Hindustani. The tree known for its elegance and exuberance has remained an attraction for artists and litterateurs. One tree believed to be planted in 1374 A.D at the Chattergam village by an Islamic mystic Syed Abul Qaim Hamadani who accompanied Mir Sayyid Ali Hamadani from Iran to Kashmir, is believed by many in Kashmir to be the world's oldest surviving chinar tree. Planting of chinar trees in Kashmir was greatly patronised by the Mughals, and later by Dogra rulers.

Chinar trees are being felled rapidly in Kashmir, although a ban was enacted in 2009 to curb cutting. Chinar trees are now required to be registered, considered State Property, and painted white at their base. Naseem Bagh a Mughal garden near Srinagar with over 700 chinar trees has been developed as a Chinar Heritage Park by the University of Kashmir.

United Kingdom
In 2011 a specimen planted by Capability Brown at Corsham Court in Wiltshire was identified in 2011 by The Tree Register of the British Isles as the tree with the greatest known spread in the United Kingdom.

An example dating to at least 1762 is one of Kew Gardens' thirteen 'Heritage Trees'.

The Pococke Garden at Christ Church, Oxford contains a specimen, known as The Pococke Tree, which is understood to have been planted by Edward Pococke from seed he collected in 1636 from Aleppo. With a girth of around 9 metres it is the oldest in the UK.

Cultural references
A plane tree is the main theme in the aria Ombra mai fu composed by George Frideric Handel, in which the main character, Xerxes I of Persia, admires the shade of a plane tree. 

The Chinar leaf is considered a national symbol in Azad Jammu and Kashmir. The government seal continues to include the leaf. Many universities, including the University of Azad Jammu and Kashmir also include the symbol. 

It is the State tree of the Indian union territory of Jammu and Kashmir. During the 2010 Commonwealth Games opening ceremony, held in India, the chinar tree was featured prominently in the 'tree of knowledge' segment of the ceremony.

The Pococke Tree in the Pococke Garden at Christ Church is thought to be the inspiration for the Tumtum tree in Lewis Carol's poem Jabberwocky.

Gallery

References

External links

Plants for a Future
Platanus orientalis
Platanus orientalis - information, genetic conservation units and related resources. European Forest Genetic Resources Programme (EUFORGEN) 

orientalis
Flora of temperate Asia
Trees of Asia
Trees of Europe
Garden plants of Asia
Garden plants of Europe
Ornamental trees
Least concern plants
Least concern biota of Asia
Least concern biota of Europe
Plants described in 1753
Taxa named by Carl Linnaeus